Bang Saen Beach is in Tambon (subdistrict) Saen Suk, Mueang Chonburi district, Chonburi province, eastern Thailand. It is about 108 km (67 mi) east of Bangkok. Regarded as a very popular beach because it is closest to Bangkok and not far from Pattaya, a world-class attraction as well.

Its name, Bang Saen, comes from folklore about two young Chonburi lovers, Saen (แสน) and Sam Muk (สามมุก). The unrequited lovers threw themselves off a cliff and drowned together. Their names became the names of many places of Chonburi, such as Khao Sam Muk, a low hill near the beach. It has a shrine for Sam Muk at the foot of the hill.

The sea at Bang Saen Beach is usually not clear. But from October to February of every year, the sea at Bang Saen Beach is as clear as the Maldives, a natural phenomenon.

The Institute of Marine Science, Burapha University or popularly known as Bang Saen Aquarium in the campus of Burapha University. The aquarium is home to a variety of creatures, ranging from clown fishes, butterfly fishes, cardinal fishes, seahorses, corals, nautiluses, horseshoe crabs, sea cucumbers, sea urchins, and starfishes. Highlights of this aquarium are a Bryde's whale skeleton from the Gulf of Thailand and a large tank housing giant groupers, blacktip reef sharks, and spotted eagle rays. It is regarded as another interesting attraction in Bang Saen Beach area.

In addition, the road from here to Pattaya is used as a venue for the annual Songkran festival called "Wan Lai" (วันไหล), which is usually held after the Songkran in other places.

References

External links 
 

Beaches of Thailand
Tourist attractions in Chonburi province